Mohammad Reza Tarshati Tehrani (died 1647), nicknamed Salim was an Iranian poet and one of the Persian-speaking poets of the Mughal Empire.

References 

Mughal Empire poets
1647 deaths
Iranian male poets
People from Tehran
Iranian emigrants to the Mughal Empire